Church of Michael the Archangel or Flotskaya (Church of the Fleet) is a Russian Orthodox church in central Baku, Azerbaijan, on Zargarpalan street. The church is dedicated to St. Michael. The church is serviced by Archpriest Mefodi Efendiyev, three priests and one deacon.

History
The church used to be among the military churches and belonged to the Caspian Flotilla and was therefore called Flotskaya. Although the exact date of the church's establishment is unknown, the approximate date is 1850, as described in writings of the "Kavkaz" (Caucasus) newspaper published in 1855. The church was built by the Caspian fleet officers in honor of the chief of the navy Alexander Nikolayevich Tsesarevich who along with Russian Emperor Nikolay I visited Baku in 1851. The building follows the Pskov construction style and the prayer room looks like a ship deck.
On 15 August 1873, by orders of Alexander II, the Flotskaya Church was transferred to the Military Office for needs of the Salyan Reserve Regiment which arrived from Lenkoran in 1868. In 1875, the management of the church was transferred to the Caspian Eparchy Office. From November 1891 to November 1892 the building underwent renovation works at a cost of 22,000 rubles. In 1906, the church was renamed to "Polkovoya - 262 of Salyan Regiment". It was eventually shut down in 1936 and turned into a communal house during the Soviet rule of Azerbaijan but was later re-opened as a church in 1946, following World War II after the role of religion in bringing victory was recognized by the Soviet authorities.
Patriarch of Moscow and All Russia Alexy II of Moscow visited the church on 25 May 2001.

See also
Alexander Nevsky Cathedral, Baku
Holy Myrrhbearers Cathedral

References

External links
 Church of Michael Archangel in Baku. Eparchy of Baku and the Caspian region (official website).
Pictures of Church of Michael Archangel

Churches in Baku
Eastern Orthodox churches in Azerbaijan
Religious organizations established in 1850
Russian Orthodox cathedrals in Asia
Churches completed in 1850
19th-century Russian Orthodox church buildings
1850 establishments in the Russian Empire
Russian Orthodox Church in Azerbaijan